Prof. Clive Finlayson MBE FLS (born 15 January 1955) is a Gibraltarian zoologist, paleoanthropologist and paleontologist. He is the incumbent Director of the Gibraltar Museum. Finlayson has published various works mainly based on his research which includes ongoing excavations at Gorham's Cave in Gibraltar, the last known site of the Neanderthals.

Education
Clive Finlayson was born on Gibraltar on 15 January 1955. He has an elder brother, Tommy Finlayson. The Finlaysons are of Scottish descent, but they have been on the Rock since the early 19th century. Clive Finlayson was educated at the Gibraltar Grammar School. He completed a BSc Special Honours degree in Zoology at the University of Liverpool in 1976. In 1980 he graduated with a Doctorate of Philosophy (DPhil) from Oriel College, Oxford and later went on to obtain an MSc in Museum Studies from Leicester University.

Career
Shortly after graduating from his degree, Finlayson became increasingly active within local natural and cultural heritage circles. He founded the Gibraltar Ornithological & Natural History Society (GONHS) in 1978, an organisation which he chaired until 1992. He was also a trustee of the Gibraltar Heritage Trust from 1987 to 1989.

Having been the managing director of the Gibraltar Tourism Agency, he took up the position of Director of the Gibraltar Museum in 1991 which he holds to date (June 2012) and is also the Director of the Gibraltar Culture and Heritage Agency's Heritage Division.

In 2001 Finlayson was appointed to the staff of the Department of Anthropology at the University of Toronto. He was made MBE in the 2003 New Year Honours.

His various publications include literature on the Neanderthals and Modern Humans as well as on ornithology and his research programme includes ongoing excavations at Gorham's Cave, the last known site of the Neanderthals, as part of the Gibraltar Caves Project. Finlayson's 2009 book on Neanderthals and their interaction with Homo sapiens expands on the idea that we were the same species since modern man contains genetic sequences that are shared with neanderthals and the possibility of interbreeding is likely. However, Finlayson discusses that because these shared genetic sequences are common across the globe then it is possible that these shared genes are due to our common heritage in Africa.

Along with his many varied roles, he also acts as a consultant to the UNESCO World Heritage Centre in Paris.

Fellowships and awards
 1976, Recipient of the first David Lack Studentship awarded by the British Ornithologists' Union.
 1990, Fellow of the Linnean Society of London.
 2001, Adjunct Professor, Department of Anthropology University of Toronto
 2003, Awarded MBE in The Queen's New Year Honours.
 2010, Elected member of Academia Europaea
 2019, Bestowed Gibraltar Medallion of Distinction
 2019, Beacon Professor, University of Gibraltar

Publications

Authored

Co-authored

References

External links

Gibraltarian historians
British zoologists
British palaeontologists
Museum directors
1955 births
Living people
Gibraltarian ornithologists
British anthropologists
Fellows of the Linnean Society of London
British paleoanthropologists
Members of the Order of the British Empire